In Pursuit of Peace is a Singaporean television drama set in Japanese-occupied Singapore during World War II. The series was first run on MediaCorp Channel 8 from 9 March to 11 May 2001 on Friday nights. The series is based on the 1999 book Eternal Vigilance: The Price of Freedom (published by Asiapac Books), which contains numerous eyewitness accounts of survivors of the Japanese occupation of Southeast Asia. In contrast with The Price of Peace, a similar television series aired on MediaCorp Channel 8 in 1997, In Pursuit of Peace focuses more on developing the main characters' stories, while the former places greater emphasis on the historical aspects of the Japanese occupation.

Plot
The series is set in Singapore and Malaya during World War II and depicts daily life before and during the Japanese occupation of Singapore from the perspectives of two Chinese families.

The Huang family run an inn in Singapore. Huang Yitang married Li Huaniang, a Nyonya woman, and has two sons (Changfeng and Changman) and a daughter (Yinxiang) with her. The Huangs also adopted an orphaned boy, Changqing, and arranged for him to marry Yinxiang when they are grown up. Things get complicated as both Yinxiang and Changqing have their own love interests: Yinxiang is enamoured with Dahai, an anti-Japanese activist, while Changqing loves his cousin, Yang Xiaomei. Unknown to everyone, Chen Yong, an employee at the inn, has a crush on Yinxiang.

The Huangs' neighbours, the Lin family, own a provision shop. Lin Songde, a widower, lives with his son (Lin Fan) and two daughters (Lin Yun and Lin Shan). The two families have arranged a marriage between Changfeng and Lin Yun when they were still young. Later, when the grown-up Changfeng and Lin Yun meet each other, they fall in love without knowing that they are already engaged. Lin Fan starts a romance with Ah-gui after saving her and her brother from a paedophilic businessman. Lin Shan is in a relationship with Warren, a British soldier, who abandons her later.

Changfeng and Lin Yun are killed in an air raid. Against his father's wishes, Lin Fan joins Dalforce and fights the Japanese during the Battle of Singapore. After the fall of Singapore, he flees to Malaya with Ah-gui, marries her and joins an underground resistance movement. Chen Yong secretly becomes an informer for the Kempeitai and infiltrates the resistance movement at the same time. He uses the Kempeitai to help him get rid of Dahai and Changqing so that he can get closer to Yinxiang and win her heart. Changqing survives, goes into hiding with Yang Xiaomei, and starts a family with her. When the Kempeitai threaten him with Yinxiang's life, Chen Yong turns vicious and betrays the resistance by leading the Kempeitai to their hideout in Malaya. In the ensuing battle, a pregnant Ah-gui sacrifices her life to save Lin Fan.

Lin Shan encounters Nishimura, a Japanese military officer, falls in love with him and eventually marries him, much to her father's chagrin. However, she ends up as a sex slave after Nishimura is assassinated by his rivals. Lin Fan returns to Singapore to take revenge on the traitor who betrayed the resistance, and he warns Yinxiang after discovering that Chen Yong is the traitor. Yinxiang pretends to marry Chen Yong, fatally stabs him on their wedding night to avenge Dahai, and disappears from Singapore. In the meantime, Lin Fan encounters Ding Yueguang, a prostitute, and starts a romance with her after they escape death together on a few occasions. However, they never get together eventually.

At the end of the war, the surviving members of the two families reunite, except Yinxiang, who sends them a letter saying she has gone to Hainan.

Historical events
Historical figures such as Goh Say Eng, Lim Boon Keng and Yamashita Tomoyuki are portrayed in the drama. One episode focuses on Goh Say Eng's internal struggles when he is torn between his role as an anti-Japanese activist and as a parent of a Japanese military officer he fathered years ago with his secret lover in Japan. In another episode, the Japanese force Lim Boon Keng to raise a "donation" of 50 million straits dollars and present it to Yamashita Tomoyuki in a public ceremony.

Cast

 Qi Yuwu as Lin Fan
 Huang Liren as Lin Fan (old)
 Lynn Poh as Lin Shan
 Richard Low as Lin Songde
 Priscelia Chan as Ah-gui
 Apple Hong as Ding Yueguang
 May Phua as Lin Yun
 Pierre Png as Huang Changfeng
 Yao Wenlong as Chen Yong
 Bernard Tan as Huang Changqing
 Irin Gan as Huang Yinxiang
 Chen Tianxiang as Huang Yitang
 Neo Swee Lin as Li Huaniang
 Jaslyn Theen as Yang Xiaomei
 Li Nanxing as Sakagami Ichiro
 Chen Shucheng as Goh Say Eng
 Nick Shen as Goh Say Eng (young)
 Robin Leong as Nishimura
 Henry Chong as Wang Changfeng
 Huang Shinan as Ah-shi
 Liang Tian as Tangshan
 Chen Guohua as Uncle Xi
 Ye Shipin as Fujiwara
 Zhou Quanxi as Wu Daichang
 David Naidu as Ah-xing
 Mohan as Ah-xing's father
 Ken Tay as Hattori
 Wang Jinlong as Ōnishi Satoru
 Li Fuliang as Dahai
 Aaron Lester as Warren
 Chen Weijian as Huang Changman
 Li Qinning as Xiaoju
 Wang Yongyou as Huang Duijin
 Lin Wen'an as Lim Boon Keng
 Huang Zhiguang as Yamashita Tomoyuki 
 Guan Xuemei as Yang Xiaomei's stepmother
 Azroy Abdul as Ali
 Cai Jianhao as Da-an
 Chen Chaosheng as Xiao-an
 Lin Xinghong as Xu Biaoqing
 Jiang Rongjie as Okishima
 Feng Weizhong as Ah-dai
 Chen Xiuling as Aimei
 Xu Yi as Keiko
 Huang Junqi as Boss An
 Peng Bilin as Qiaoqing
 Luo Aihui as Anna
 Bu Jianxing as Ziqiang
 Cai Qingpao as Ah-gou
 Zhu Enjie as Honggu
 Li Meijiao as Ah-gui's aunt
 Lin Peifang as Lin Yun's grandmother
 Kenneth J. Meals as Professor William
 Huang Degang as Japanese officer
 Li Xiuhua as doctor

See also
 The Price of Peace
 A War Diary

External links
 Official page on toggle.sg
 Introduction to the series with a synopsis for each episode 

Singapore Chinese dramas
2001 Singaporean television series debuts
2001 Singaporean television series endings
World War II television drama series
Channel 8 (Singapore) original programming